Biker Battleground Phoenix is a scripted reality television series developed for the History Channel. Narrated by Greg Berger, the series pits five rival bike-builders from Phoenix, Arizona, against each other to see who can design and build the best bike to put an end to their rivalry and smack talking. The first episode aired on Thursday, July 1, 2014, at 10:00 pm.

Premise
After legendary bike-designer Paul Yaffe finds out his competition is stealing his ideas and seeing his designs in magazines and his rivals posting them on social media, he decides to answer them by issuing a custom bike-building challenge. He believes the only way to get out of this situation is to challenge his rivals to a "real build" and end this smack talk once and for all. Yaffe says, "Let's compete in our own an old-school of craftsmanship battle of hands and creativity. Five identical bikes, lock yourself in your garage, your tools, your hands, your crew and create what you can." Yaffe contacts his four business enemies and meets them in person at the world-famous Hideaway Grill in Cave Creek, Arizona to discuss the terms before going head-to-head on his bike-build challenge.

Throughout the series, these Arizona bike-builders go through a series of struggles; from forging friendships to risking rivalries. Either way, viewers will watch their emotions unfold by getting an up-close and personal look at their skills of craftsmanship that go into making some of the best custom Baggers in the world. The Bagger-style motorcycles are cruisers outfitted with saddlebags on their tail which are ideal for touring, hence the name "baggers". The backdrop of Phoenix was chosen because of how well the baggers are represented by the bike shops who produce their own customized cruisers. This signature style of baggers started out there and the local builders set all the latest trends.

Opening Introduction: (narrated by Greg Berger)

The Bike Builders
Paul Yaffe – "The Legend" (Paul Yaffe Originals) For the past 30 years, he's dominated the custom-motorcycle scene in Arizona. They call him "The Governor". He made his fame in the 1980s with the Chopper and then later with the Bagger. 
Brian Jenkins – "The Rebel" (Hatred Customs) He builds every one of his custom bikes from scratch from scrap metal parts from the local junkyard in his own garage. 
Kody McNew – "The Young Gun" (VooDooo Bikeworks) He made a name for himself last year by winning awards at Sturgis, the largest bike-building competition in the world, by turning his hobby into an empire overnight with his stylistic bikes. 
John Shope – "The Risk Taker" (Dirty Bird Concepts) Yaffe's number one rival, Shope, has fought his way to the top, and in just eight years, he built a multimillion-dollar empire from the ground up. 
Len Edmondson – "The Outsider" (Azzkikr Customs) Edmondson is a Canadian billionaire who sold his construction company in Vancouver and moved to Phoenix to start his own custom bike business.

Bike Builder's Throwdown
The terms: Five identical stock bikes that each go to a builder's shop with the doors close. The builders can only spend $5,000 on it, and nobody who doesn't work for them can work on the bike. It's whatever they can do to modify that bike as it sits with what they have to work with. And the only one who can fabricate the bike is the owner, however, it's their decision if they want to involve their crews to help. Bottom line - There's a $5,000 limit and the bikes have to be rideable. The timeline is three months.

Yaffe Challenge Rules:

6 week build timeframe to complete their bikes
only current employees can work on the bike (no outside contractors are allowed)
$5,000 in Harley-Davidson parts (through their sponsoring dealerships)
$2,000 of their own money to spend on aftermarket accessories

Results

Sturgis Bike Building Contests

Full Throttle "Baddest Bagger" Contest:

"Mike and Angie Ballard" Award (owners of the Full Throttle Saloon: Brian Jenkins)
"Baddest Biker" Award: Tim McNamer of Ballistic Cycles (for his hubless bagger)

The 26th Annual Rat Hole Custom Bike Show:

"Best of Show" Award: Brian Jenkins

''Buffalo Chip'' "Supreme Sturgis Showdown":

Rules/Judges: Five motorcycle industry experts evaluate the bikes for "form", "fit" and "finish".

Results
1st Place: John Shope - "Chrome King"
2nd Place: Paul Yaffe - SRT Bike
3rd Place: Kody McNew - Turbine Jet Bike
4th Place: Len Edmondson - "Race Star"
5th Place: Brian Jenkins - Red Bagger

People's Choice Award: John Shope - "Chrome King"

Episodes

References

External links
 
 
 
 Azzkikr Custom Baggers Website
 Dirty Bird Concepts Website
 Hatred Customs Facebook Page
 Paul Yaffe Originals Website
 VooDoo Bikeworks Website

2014 American television series debuts
English-language television shows
History (American TV channel) original programming
Television series by BBC Studios
Motorcycle television series
American non-fiction television series